The Voice of Poland (season 11) began airing on 12 September 2020 on TVP 2. It aired on Saturdays at 21:00

Michał Szpak and Tomson & Baron returned as coaches again. Also Edyta Górniak returned to the show after a five-year break for her fourth season. Urszula Dudziak, was the new coach in the eleventh season, who resigned from being a coach in The Voice Senior show and joined the jury panel of the eleventh season of The Voice of Poland.

Krystian Ochman won the season, marking Michał Szpak's second and final win as a coach.

Coaches and hosts

On August 10, 2020, it was announced that Michał Szpak, Tomson & Baron, Edyta Górniak and Urszula Dudziak would become the coaches for the eleventh season of the show.
Małgorzata Tomaszewska replaced Marcelina Zawadzka as the show's new host, alongside returning presenters Tomasz Kammel and Maciej Musiał, and Adam Zdrójkowski.

Teams

Blind auditions

Episode 1 (September 12, 2020)

Episode 2 (September 12, 2020)

Episode 3 (September 19, 2020)

Episode 4 (September 19, 2020)

Episode 5 (September 26, 2020)

Episode 6 (September 26, 2020)

Episode 7 (October 3, 2020)

Episode 8 (October 3, 2020)

Episode 9 (October 10, 2020)

Episode 10 (October 10, 2020)

The Battle Rounds
Color keys

The Knockout Round

Episode 14 (November 7, 2020)
Knockouts took place on 7 November 2020.

Color keys

 by Baranovski
 by Kamil Bednarek

Live Shows

Color keys

Episode 15 (November 14, 2020)

  - Due to the detection of the COVID-19 virus, artist Michał Matuszewski had to resign from the next stage of the program. The production of the program decided to restore artist Martyna Zygadło, who was dropped out in the Nokaut episode in place of Michał Matuszewski.

Episode 16 - Quarter-Final (November 21, 2020)

Episode 17 - Semifinal (November 28, 2020)

Episode 18 - Final (December 5, 2020)

Results summary of live shows

Overall
Color keys
Artist's info

Result details

Team
Artist's info

Result details

References

The Voice of Poland
2020 Polish television seasons